Olivar de Quintos is one of the two end point stations of Seville Metro on the line 1. It will also be a tram stop of the Dos Hermanas tram line. Olivar de Quintos is a ground station located in the avenue of Montequinto in the municipality of Dos Hermanas, Seville. It was opened on 23 November 2009.

See also
 List of Seville metro stations

References

External links 
  Official site.
 History, construction details and maps.

Seville Metro stations
Railway stations in Spain opened in 2009